is a Japanese anime television series produced by Fanworks, based on San-X's series of mascot characters of the same name. It aired from October 2021 to March 2022.  A second season premiered in September 2022.

Characters

Production and release 
On February 12, 2021, San-X revealed the "Chickip Dancers," a new series of mascot characters that would star in an anime television series of the same name. The series is produced by Fanworks and directed by Rareko, who is also overseeing the series' scripts alongside Shigenori Tanabe. It aired from October 5, 2021 to March 29, 2022 on NHK Educational TV. Erino Yumiki performed the opening theme "Chickip Dance".

Aside from the anime series, character goods and other media mix will also be developed.

A second season premiered in September 27, 2022.

Episode list

Notes

References

External links 
 

Animated television series about animals
Anime with original screenplays
Fanworks (animation studio)
San-X characters
Slice of life anime and manga